Levinsky or Levinský is a surname. Notable people with the surname include:

Alex Levinsky (1910–1990), professional ice hockey player in the National Hockey League
Battling Levinsky (1891–1949), light heavyweight boxing champion of the world
Benjamin Levinsky (1893–1922), American gang leader, labor racketeer and organized crime figure
Dmitri Levinsky (born 1981), Kazak professional ice hockey player
Jaroslav Levinský (born 1981), professional doubles tennis player from the Czech Republic
King Levinsky (1910–1991), also known as Kingfish Levinsky, an American heavyweight boxer
Roland Levinsky (1943–2007), academic researcher in biomedicine and a university senior manager
Walt Levinsky (1929–1999), American big band and orchestral player, composer, arranger and band leader

See also
The Rise of David Levinsky, novel by Abraham Cahan
Lewinski
Lewinsky (surname)
Ivan Levynskyi (1851–1919), Ukrainian-German architect

Jewish surnames
Levite surnames
East Slavic-language surnames
Slavic-language surnames